The 65th New York State Legislature, consisting of the New York State Senate and the New York State Assembly, met from January 4 to September 7, 1842, during the fourth year of William H. Seward's governorship, in Albany.

Background
Under the provisions of the New York Constitution of 1821, 32 Senators were elected on general tickets in eight senatorial districts for four-year terms. They were divided into four classes, and every year eight Senate seats came up for election. Assemblymen were elected countywide on general tickets to a one-year term, the whole Assembly being renewed annually.

State Senator Minthorne Tompkins resigned on March 8, 1841; and State Senator Mark H. Sibley resigned on May 28, 1841; leaving vacancies in the First and Seventh District.

Secretary of State John C. Spencer (W) resigned on October 11, 1841, to take office as U.S. Secretary of War.

At this time there were two political parties: the Democratic Party and the Whig Party.

In New York City, the "friends of civil and religious freedom, in favor of extending the benefits of a common school education to the neglected and indigent children of this city" met on October 26, 1841, at Carroll Hall, and nominated a ticket for the Senate and Assembly elections. The Carroll Hall assembly ticket was made up of 10 of the 13 Tammany Hall (Democratic) nominees and three own candidates. The spoiler effect led to the election of one Whig and one Democrat to the Senate, and of 10 Democrats and 3 Whigs to the Assembly.

Elections
The State election was held from November 1 to 3, 1841.

State Senator Henry A. Livingston (2nd D.) was defeated for re-election.

Sessions
The Legislature met for the regular session at the Old State Capitol in Albany on January 4, 1842; and adjourned on April 12.

Levi S. Chatfield (D) was elected Speaker with 93 votes against 32 for George A. Simmons (W). John O. Cole (D) was elected Clerk of the Assembly with 91 votes against 33 for the incumbent Philander B. Prindle (W).

On January 12, John L. O'Sullivan (D) brought a bill in the Assembly to abolish capital punishment, which was rejected on March 31 by a vote of 45 to 54.

On February 7, the Legislature elected Samuel Young (D) to fill the vacancy in the office of Secretary of State; Azariah C. Flagg (D) to succeed John A. Collier (W) as State Comptroller; Thomas Farrington (D) to succeed Jacob Haight (W) as State Treasurer; George P. Barker (D) to succeed Willis Hall (W) as Attorney General; and Nathaniel Jones (D) to succeed Orville L. Holley as Surveyor General.

On February 8, the Legislature elected Daniel P. Bissell, Stephen Clark, Jonas Earll, Jr., Benjamin Enos, James Hooker and George W. Little to succeed George H. Boughton, Simon Newton Dexter, Henry Hamilton, David Hudson, Samuel B. Ruggles and Asa Whitney as Canal Commissioners.

On April 5, the Legislature enacted that future state elections be held on a single day, fixing the date on the Tuesday next after the first Monday in November.

The Legislature met for a special session on August 16; and adjourned on September 7. This session was called to re-apportion the congressional districts. Earlier this year Congress had passed a law requiring all representatives in all States to be elected in single districts, and in New York there had been for decades several multiple-seat districts.

On September 7, the Democratic state convention met at Syracuse, and nominated again William C. Bouck for Governor, and Daniel S. Dickinson for Lieutenant Governor.

On the same day, the Whig state convention met; Charles H. Carroll was Chairman. They nominated Lt. Gov. Luther Bradish for Governor, and State Senator Gabriel Furman for Lieutenant Governor.

State Senate

Districts
 The First District (4 seats) consisted of Kings, New York and Richmond counties.
 The Second District (4 seats) consisted of Dutchess, Orange, Putnam, Queens, Rockland, Suffolk, Sullivan, Ulster and Westchester counties.
 The Third District (4 seats) consisted of Albany, Columbia, Delaware, Greene, Rensselaer, Schenectady and Schoharie counties.
 The Fourth District (4 seats) consisted of Clinton, Essex, Franklin, Fulton, Hamilton, Herkimer, Montgomery, St. Lawrence, Saratoga, Warren and Washington counties.
 The Fifth District (4 seats) consisted of Jefferson, Lewis, Madison, Oneida, Oswego and Otsego counties.
 The Sixth District (4 seats) consisted of Allegany, Broome, Cattaraugus, Chemung, Chenango, Livingston, Steuben, Tioga and Tompkins counties.
 The Seventh District (4 seats) consisted of Cayuga, Cortland, Onondaga, Ontario, Seneca, Wayne and Yates counties.
 The Eighth District (4 seats) consisted of Chautauqua, Erie, Genesee, Monroe, Niagara, Orleans and Wyoming counties.

Note: There are now 62 counties in the State of New York. The counties which are not mentioned in this list had not yet been established, or sufficiently organized, the area being included in one or more of the abovementioned counties.

Members
The asterisk (*) denotes members of the previous Legislature who continued in office as members of this Legislature.

Employees
 Clerk: Isaac R. Elwood

State Assembly

Districts

 Albany County (3 seats)
 Allegany County (2 seats)
 Broome County (1 seat)
 Cattaraugus County (2 seats)
 Cayuga County (3 seats)
 Chautauqua County (3 seats)
 Chemung County (1 seat)
 Chenango County (3 seats)
 Clinton County (1 seat)
 Columbia County (3 seats)
 Cortland County (2 seats)
 Delaware County (2 seats)
 Dutchess County (3 seats)
 Erie County (3 seats)
 Essex County (1 seat)
 Franklin County (1 seat)
 Fulton and Hamilton counties (1 seat)
 Genesee County (2 seats)
 Greene County (2 seats)
 Herkimer County (2 seats)
 Jefferson County (3 seats)
 Kings County (2 seats)
 Lewis County (1 seat)
 Livingston County (2 seats)
 Madison County (3 seats)
 Monroe County (3 seats)
 Montgomery County (2 seats)
 The City and County of New York (13 seats)
 Niagara County (2 seats)
 Oneida County (4 seats)
 Onondaga County (4 seats)
 Ontario County (3 seats)
 Orange County (3 seats)
 Orleans County (1 seat)
 Oswego County (2 seats)
 Otsego County (3 seats)
 Putnam County (1 seat)
 Queens County (1 seat)
 Rensselaer County (3 seats)
 Richmond County (1 seat)
 Rockland County (1 seat)
 St. Lawrence County (2 seats)
 Saratoga County (2 seats)
 Schenectady County (1 seat)
 Schoharie County (2 seats)
 Seneca County (1 seat)
 Steuben County (3 seats)
 Suffolk County (2 seats)
 Sullivan County (1 seat)
 Tioga County (1 seat)
 Tompkins County (2 seats)
 Ulster County (2 seats)
 Warren County (1 seat)
 Washington (2 seats)
 Wayne County (2 seats)
 Westchester County (2 seats)
 Wyoming County (2 seats)
 Yates County (1 seat)

Note: There are now 62 counties in the State of New York. The counties which are not mentioned in this list had not yet been established, or sufficiently organized, the area being included in one or more of the abovementioned counties.

Assemblymen
The asterisk (*) denotes members of the previous Legislature who continued as members of this Legislature.

Party affiliations follow the vote on State officers on February 1, 7 and 8.

Employees
 Clerk: John O. Cole
 Sergeant-at-Arms: Abner N. Beardsley
 Doorkeeper: John W. Turner
 Assistant Doorkeepers: George Van Deusen
 Second Assistant Doorkeeper: Pliny M. Bromley, from January 8, 1842

Notes

Sources
 The New York Civil List compiled by Franklin Benjamin Hough (Weed, Parsons and Co., 1858) [pg. 109 and 441 for Senate districts; pg. 133 for senators; pg. 148f for Assembly districts; pg. 225ff for assemblymen]
 Political History of the State of New York from January 1, 1841, to January 1, 1847, Vol III, including the Life of Silas Wright (Hall & Dickson, Syracuse NY, 1848; pg. 247 to 311)
The Tribune Almanac 1838 to 1868 ("The Whig Almanac 1843"; pg. 39)

065
1842 in New York (state)
1842 U.S. legislative sessions